Sir John Bretland Farmer  FRS FRSE (5 April 1865 – 26 January 1944) was a British botanist. He believed that chromomeres not chromosomes were the unit of heredity. Farmer and J. E. S. Moore introduced the term meiosis in 1905.

Life

He was born at Atherstone in Warwickshire the son of John Henry Farmer and his wife Elizabeth Corbett Bretland. He attended the Queen Elizabeth Grammar School in Atherstone.

He won a place at Magdalen College, Oxford, graduating MA in 1887. During this period he was greatly influenced by Prof Isaac Bayley Balfour. He was made a Fellow of Magdalen College 1889–1897, demonstrator of botany in 1887–1892, and assistant professor of biology in 1892–1895 at Oxford, and then became professor of botany at Imperial College London. He received the Doctor of Science (D.Sc.) from the University of Oxford in March 1902.

He was elected a Fellow of the Royal Society in 1900, was awarded its Royal Medal in 1919 and was its vice-president from 1919 to 1921. He was also President of the Alpine Climbers Club 1910–12.

He was knighted in 1926 for services to botany and scientific education.

He died in Exmouth on the southern English coast on 26 January 1944.

Family
In 1892, he married Edith May Gertrude Pritchard.

Publications
Farmer was an editor of the Annals of Botany (1906-1922), and wrote particularly on cytology. He was also editor of the John Murray–published journal, Science Progress in the Twentieth Century (from 1909 to 1912), and Gardeners' Chronicle (1904 to 1906). His books include:
Flowering Plants (1899)
Elementary Botany (1904)
The Book of Nature Study (6 vols) (1908 onwards)
Translation of Die Mutationstheorie (1911) co-written with Arthur Dukinfield Darbishire
Plant Life (1913)
Nature and Development of Plants (1918)

References

Academics of Imperial College London
Alumni of Magdalen College, Oxford
Fellows of Magdalen College, Oxford
Fellows of the Royal Society
Knights Bachelor
English botanists
British male journalists
1865 births
1944 deaths
Royal Medal winners
People from Atherstone